Rinə (also, Reyna) is a village and municipality in the Astara Rayon of Azerbaijan.  It has a population of 925.  The municipality consists of the villages of Rinə, Vıləşə, Taxtakəran, and Çuvaş.

References 

Populated places in Astara District